Jim York may refer to:
 Jim York (catcher)
 Jim York (pitcher)
 Jim York (fighter)

See also
 James York (disambiguation)